Frauenzell Abbey was a Benedictine monastery situated in Frauenzell, which is part of Brennberg in Bavaria, Germany.

Dedicated to the Virgin Mary, the monastery was founded in 1321 by Count Reinmar IV von Brennberg, developing an existing hermitage. At first a cell of Oberalteich Abbey, it became a dependent priory in 1350 and was granted the status of an independent abbey in 1424.

It was dissolved in 1803 in the secularisation of the period. Some of the buildings were used for the accommodation of the school and the minister's house; the rest were sold to the villagers. The monastic church remains as a parish and pilgrimage church.

References

Further reading
 Die Kunstdenkmäler von Oberpfalz & Regensburg, Bd. 21: Bezirksamt Regensburg, ed. Felix Mader. München 1910, pp. 53–70
 Georg Dehio: Handbuch der Deutschen Kunstdenkmäler. Bayern V: Regensburg und die Oberpfalz, revised by Jolanda Drexler and Achim Hubel with Astrid Debold-Kritter et al., München / Berlin 1991, pp. 156–160
 Germania Benedictina. Band 2: Bayern. St. Ottilien 1970
 Franz Seraph Gsellhofer: "Beiträge zur Geschichte des ehemaligen Klosters U. L. Frauenzell", in: Verhandlungen des Historischen Vereins für Oberpfalz und Regensburg, Band 8 (1844), pp. 41–62
 Herbert Schindler: "Frauenzell. Ein Waldkloster und seine Geschichte", in: Unbekanntes Bayern, Bd. 1, München 1955, pp. 159–169

External links
 

Benedictine monasteries in Germany
Monasteries in Bavaria
1320s establishments in the Holy Roman Empire
1321 establishments in Europe
Religious organizations established in the 1320s
Christian monasteries established in the 14th century